Phantom Lady may refer to:

Phantom Lady, a comic superhero originally from the 1940s
Phantom Lady (novel), a 1942 crime novel by Cornell Woolrich
Phantom Lady (film), a film noir adaptation of the novel
The Phantom Lady (La dama duende), a 17th-century Spanish play
The Phantom Lady (film), a 1945 Argentine film